Amaravati is the capital city of Svarga, the realm of Indra, the king of the devas, in Hinduism, Buddhism, and Jainism. It is also called Devapura, ‘city of the devas’ and Pūṣābhāsā, ‘sun-splendour’ in the Puranas.

Description 

In Hindu tradition, Amaravati was built by Vishvakarma, the architect of the devas, a son of Brahma, but sometimes also depicted as a son of Kashyapa. At the centre of Amaravati is Vaijayanta, the palace of Indra, or Śakra (Buddhism) in Buddhism. The heaven of Indra is a region for the virtuous alone, with celestial gardens called Nandana Vana, that houses sacred trees, like the wish-fulfilling Kalpavriksha, as well as sweet-scented flowers such as hibiscuses, roses, hyacinths, freesias, magnolias, gardenias, jasmines, and honeysuckles. Fragrant almond extract is sprinkled on the sides of palaces. The fragrant groves are occupied by apsaras. Low sweet music is stated to play in this land. Indra's abode is eight hundred miles in circumference and forty miles in height.

The denizens of Amaravati include the devas, danavas, gandharvas, kinnaras, uragas, and rakshasas, as well as fortunate human beings who are on par with the devas in this realm.

The pillars of Amaravati are composed of diamonds, and its furniture is made of pure gold. Amaravati's palaces are also made of gold. Pleasant breezes are described to carry the perfume of rose-coloured flowers. The inhabitants of Amaravati are entertained by music, dancing, and every sort of festivity. Divinity is stated to fill up the entire region. The audience chamber of Amaravati accommodates the thirty-three celestials called the Trāyastriṃśa, together with the forty-eight thousand rishis, and a multitude of attendants. In the Mahabharata, Indra has another celestial meeting hall at Amaravati, known as Pushkara-Malini, which he is described to have built himself.

Literature

Skanda Purana 
In the Skanda Purana, the environs of the city are described:

Brahma Purana 
In the Brahma Purana, the city of Dvaraka built by Krishna is stated to describe Amaravati, consisting of grand parks and outer walls, boasting hundreds of lakes, as well as hundreds of thick ramparts.

See also
 Svarga
 Devaloka
 Vaikuntha
 Satyaloka
 Kailasa

References

External links 
 
 

Locations in Hindu mythology
Hindu cosmology